The 22nd Annual Grammy Awards were held on February 27, 1980, at Shrine Auditorium, Los Angeles, and were broadcast live on American television. They recognized accomplishments by musicians from the year 1979. This year was notable for being the first year to have a designated category for Rock music.

Album of the Year went to Phil Ramone and Billy Joel for 52nd Street, and Song of the Year went to Kenny Loggins and Michael McDonald for "What a Fool Believes".

Winners
Record of the Year
"What a Fool Believes"―The Doobie Brothers
Ted Templeman (producer)
"After the Love Has Gone"―Earth, Wind & Fire
Maurice White (producer)
"I Will Survive"—Gloria Gaynor
Dino Fekaris & Freddie Perren
"The Gambler"—Kenny Rogers
Larry Butler (producer)
"You Don't Bring Me Flowers"—Barbra Streisand & Neil Diamond
Bob Gaudio (producer)
Album of the Year
52nd Street—Billy JoelPhil Ramone (producer)Minute by Minute—The Doobie Brothers
Ted Templeman (producer)
The Gambler—Kenny Rogers
Larry Butler (producer)
Bad Girls—Donna Summer
Giorgio Moroder & Pete Bellotte (producers)
Breakfast in America—Supertramp
Peter Henderson & Supertramp (producers)
Song of the Year"What a Fool Believes"—The Doobie BrothersKenny Loggins & Michael McDonald (songwriters) "After the Love Has Gone"—Earth, Wind & Fire
 David Foster, Jay Graydon & Bill Champlin (songwriters)
 "Chuck E.'s in Love"—Rickie Lee Jones
 Rickie Lee Jones (songwriter)
 "Honesty"—Billy Joel
 Billy Joel (songwriter)
 "I Will Survive"—Gloria Gaynor
 Dino Fekaris & Freddie Perren (songwriters)
 "Minute by Minute"—The Doobie Brothers
 Lester Abrams & Michael McDonald (songwriters)
 "Reunited"—Peaches & Herb
 Dino Fekaris & Freddie Perren (songwriters)
 "She Believes in Me"—Kenny Rogers
 Steve Gibb (songwriter)
Best New ArtistRickie Lee JonesChildren's

Best Recording for Children
Jim Henson & Paul Williams (producers) for The Muppet Movie performed by The Muppets

Classical

Best Classical Orchestral Recording
James Mallinson (producer), Georg Solti (conductor) & the Chicago Symphony Orchestra for Brahms: Symphonies (1-4)
Best Classical Vocal Soloist Performance
Luciano Pavarotti & the Bologna Orchestra for O Sole Mio - Favorite Neapolitan Songs
Best Opera Recording
Vittorio Negri (producer), Colin Davis (conductor), Heather Harper, Jonathan Summers, Jon Vickers & the Royal Opera House Orchestra for Britten: Peter Grimes
Best Choral Performance, Classical (other than opera)
Georg Solti (conductor), Margaret Hillis (choir director), & the Chicago Symphony Orchestra & Chorus for Brahms: A German Requiem
Best Classical Performance - Instrumental Soloist or Soloists (with orchestra)
Claudio Abbado (conductor), Maurizio Pollini & the Chicago Symphony Orchestra for Bartók: Piano Cons. Nos. 1 & 2
Best Classical Performance - Instrumental Soloist or Soloists (without orchestra)
Vladimir Horowitz for The Horowitz Concerts 1978/79
Best Chamber Music Performance
Dennis Russell Davies (conductor) & the St. Paul Chamber Orchestra for Copland: Appalachian Spring
Best Classical Album
James Mallinson (producer), Georg Solti (conductor) & the Chicago Symphony Orchestra for Brahms: Symphonies (1-4)

Comedy

Best Comedy Recording"Reality...What a Concept"-Robin WilliamsComposing and arranging
Best Instrumental CompositionSuperman Main Title ThemeJohn Williams (composer)Best Album of Original Score Written for a Motion Picture or a Television Special"Superman"John Williams (composer)Best Instrumental Arrangement
'"Soulful Strut"'Claus Ogerman (arranger) (George Benson)Best Arrangement Accompanying Vocals
'"What a Fool Believes"'Michael McDonald (arranger) (The Doobie Brothers)Country
Best Country Vocal Performance, Female"Blue Kentucky Girl"-Emmylou HarrisBest Country Vocal Performance, Male"The Gambler"-Kenny RogersBest Country Vocal Performance by a Duo or Group"The Devil Went Down to Georgia"-The Charlie Daniels BandBest Country Instrumental Performance"Big Sandy/Leather Britches"-Doc Watson & Merle WatsonBest Country Song"You Decorated My Life"-Kenny RogersDebbie Hupp & Bob Morrison songwritersDisco

The award for Best Disco Recording was first given out at the 1980 Grammy Awards; however, this was the only year it was ever presented.

Best Disco Recording"I Will Survive"-Gloria GaynorDino Fekaris & Freddie Perren (producers)Folk

Best Ethnic or Traditional Recording
Muddy Waters for Muddy "Mississippi" Waters Live

Gospel

Best Gospel Performance, Traditional
Blackwood Brothers for Lift Up the Name of Jesus
Best Gospel Performance, Contemporary
The Imperials for Heed the Call
Best Soul Gospel Performance, Traditional
Mighty Clouds of Joy for Changing Times
Best Soul Gospel Performance, Contemporary
Andrae Crouch for I'll Be Thinking of You
Best Inspirational Performance
B. J. Thomas for You Gave Me Love (When Nobody Gave Me a Prayer)

Historical

Best Historical Reissue
Michael Brooks & Jerry Korn (producers) for Billie Holiday - Giants of Jazz

Jazz

Best Jazz Instrumental Performance, Soloist
Oscar Peterson for Jousts
Best Jazz Instrumental Performance, Group
Chick Corea & Gary Burton for Duet
Best Jazz Instrumental Performance, Big Band
Duke Ellington for Duke Ellington at Fargo, 1940 Live
Best Jazz Fusion Performance, Vocal or Instrumental
Weather Report for 8:30
Best Jazz Vocal Performance
Ella Fitzgerald for Fine and Mellow

Latin

Best Latin Recording
Irakere for Irakere

Musical show

Best Cast Show Album
Stephen Sondheim (composer & lyricist), Thomas Z. Shepard (producer) & the original cast with Angela Lansbury & Len Cariou for Sweeney Todd

Packaging and notes

Best Album Package
Mick Haggerty & Mike Doud (art directors) for Breakfast in America performed by Supertramp
Best Album Notes
Bob Porter & James Patrick (notes writers) for Charlie Parker - The Complete Savoy Sessions performed by Charlie Parker

Pop
Best Pop Vocal Performance, Female"I'll Never Love This Way Again" — Dionne Warwick"I Will Survive"-Gloria Gaynor
"Chuck E.'s in Love"-Rickie Lee Jones
"Don't Cry Out Loud"-Melissa Manchester
"Bad Girls"-Donna Summer
Best Pop Vocal Performance, Male"52nd Street" — Billy Joel"Sad Eyes" — Robert John
"She Believes in Me"-Kenny Rogers
"Da Ya Think I'm Sexy?"-Rod Stewart
"Up on the Roof"-James Taylor
Best Pop Vocal Performance by a Duo, Group or Chorus"Minute by Minute" — The Doobie Brothers"Sail On"-The Commodores
"Lonesome Loser"-Little River Band
"You Don't Bring Me Flowers"-Barbra Streisand & Neil Diamond
"Breakfast in America"-Supertramp
Best Pop Instrumental Performance"Rise"-Herb AlpertProduction and engineering

Best Engineered Recording, Non-Classical
Peter Henderson (engineer): Breakfast in America (Supertramp)
Best Engineered Recording, Classical
Anthony Salvatore (engineer) & the original cast with Angela Lansbury & Len Cariou for Sondheim: Sweeney Todd
Producer of the Year
Larry Butler
Classical Producer of the Year
James Mallinson

R&B
Best R&B Vocal Performance, Female"Deja Vu" — Dionne WarwickBest R&B Vocal Performance, Male"Don't Stop 'Til You Get Enough" — Michael JacksonBest R&B Vocal Performance by a Duo, Group or Chorus"After the Love Has Gone" — Earth, Wind & FireBest R&B Instrumental Performance"Boogie Wonderland" — Earth, Wind & FireBest R&B SongAfter the Love Has Gone" — Earth, Wind & Fire Bill Champlin, David Foster & Jay Graydon (songwriters)Rock

Best Rock Vocal Performance, FemaleHot Stuff — Donna SummerBest Rock Vocal Performance, MaleGotta Serve Somebody — Bob DylanBest Rock Vocal Performance by a Duo or GroupHeartache Tonight — The EaglesBest Rock Instrumental PerformanceRockestra Theme — Paul McCartney & Wings'''

Spoken

Best Spoken Word, Documentary or Drama Recording
John Gielgud for Ages of Man — Readings From Shakespeare''

References

External links
22nd Grammy Awards, at the Internet Movie Database

 022
1980 in California
1980 music awards
1980 in Los Angeles
1980 in American music
Grammy
February 1980 events in the United States